Max Wirth (Breslau, 27 January 1822 — Vienna, 18 July 1900) was a German journalist and economist.

Life 
Max Wirth is the son of Johann Georg August Wirth, a Bavarian writer and organizer of the Hambach Festival in 1832. Max studied law and political economy at the University of Heidelberg, where he joined the Corps Rhenania. Later he became a journalist in Frankurt, where he founded the weekly magazine Der Arbeitgeber, a publication about the labour market, but also used to progress Wirth's personal views. He was part of various economic congresses and industrial associations. Between 1865 and 1873, he was director of the Swiss Statistical Bureau. Afterwards, he worked as a journalist again, first for the Neuen Freien Presse, later as Viennese correspondent for The Economist.

Work 
Max Wirth is mostly known his work Geschichte der Handelskrisen, a history of economic crises. The book went through four editions, the last editions appearing in 1890. He also wrote a book on the banking history of Germany and Austria-Hungary.

His name is cited disparagingly by Marx in Capital vol. I as 'Herr M. Wirth' to exemplify to the reader the 'run-of-the-mill vulgar economist and propagandist', being a name known to many German readers at the time.

References

German economists
Journalists from Wrocław
German male journalists
German expatriates in Austria
People from the Province of Silesia
1822 births
1900 deaths
19th-century German journalists
19th-century German male writers